Chandrasekaran is a surname. Notable people with the surname include:

A. Chandrasekaran, Indian politician and former Member of the Legislative Assembly of Tamil Nadu
Chidambara Chandrasekaran, (1911–2000), Indian demographer and statistician
Durai Chandrasekaran, Indian politician and incumbent Member of the Legislative Assembly of Tamil Nadu
K. B. V. Sc. Chandrasekaran, Indian politician and incumbent Member of the Legislative Assembly of Tamil Nadu
K N Chandrasekaran Pillai, Indian legal academic
M. Chandrasekaran, Carnatic classical violinist from Chennai (formerly Madras), Tamil Nadu
Natarajan Chandrasekaran, (born June 1963), Indian business executive, Chairman of Tata Sons
Periyasamy Chandrasekaran (1957–2010), Sri Lankan politician
Rajiv Chandrasekaran, Indian-American journalist
S. Chandrasekaran (born 1959), contemporary modern artist

See also
Chandrasekhar (disambiguation)
Chandrasekharania